Connarus turczaninowii is a dicotyledonous plant species described by José Jerónimo Triana and Planch.

It is named after Russian botanist Nikolai Turczaninow.

Range
It is found in Panama.

References 

Connaraceae
Flora of Panama